Podareš is a village in the municipality of Radoviš, North Macedonia. It is located 6.9 km east of Radovis. and it used to be a municipality of its own.

Demographics
According to the 2002 census, the village had a total of 1,527 inhabitants. Ethnic groups in the village include:

Macedonians 1,515
Turks 11
Serbs 1

Notable people
 Jordan Mitev (Musician)

References

Villages in Radoviš Municipality